Phyllonorycter eugregori is a moth of the family Gracillariidae. It is known from the Czech Republic, Slovakia, Hungary, Croatia and Montenegro.

The larvae feed on Chamaecytisus austriacus and Chamaecytisus ratisbonensis. They mine the leaves of their host plant. They create a lower-surface, transversely folded, tentiform mine.

References

eugregori
Moths of Europe
Moths described in 2006